The Rotokakahi River is a river of the Northland Region of New Zealand's North Island. Its winding course is predominantly southwestward from its origins in the Maungataniwha Range.

See also
List of rivers of New Zealand

References

Far North District
Rivers of the Northland Region
Rivers of New Zealand